Urothemis luciana is a species of dragonfly in the family Libellulidae. It is endemic to South Africa.

References 

Libellulidae
Insects of South Africa
Taxa named by Boris Balinsky
Insects described in 1961
Taxonomy articles created by Polbot